Colorado Street Bridge may refer to:
Colorado Street Bridge (Pasadena, California)
Colorado Street Bridge (Saint Paul, Minnesota)